Enlight may refer to:
eNlight Cloud, cloud computing platform
Enlight Media, Chinese media company
Enlight Pictures, Chinese film production company
Enlight Renewable Energy, energy company of Israel
Enlight Software, American video game company
ENLiGHT demoparty, now known as Chaos Constructions